WHAI (98.3 FM) is an adult contemporary radio station in Greenfield, Massachusetts, owned by the Western Mass Radio Group subsidiary of Saga Communications. WHAI originated on the AM dial in 1938, adding WHAI-FM on May 15, 1948. WHAI then became WHMQ in 2001, and began to carry different programming from the FM signal.

References

External links

HAI
Greenfield, Massachusetts
Radio stations established in 1948
Mass media in Franklin County, Massachusetts